The second season of the Philippine television series Masked Singer Pilipinas premiered on TV5 on March 19to June 18, 2022, replacing Sing Galing: Sing-lebrity Edition.

Production 
A second season was announced during the finale of the first season. A new logo for the season was published on the official Facebook page of the show. Filming for the second season started on October 29, 2021 and concluded on December 10, 2021. Similar to the previous season, a virtual audience is present via Zoom.

Broadcast 
Due to the PiliPinas Debates 2022, the pilot episode of the season was aired 30 minutes earlier. The show did not air on April 16, 2022, in observance of Holy Week, as Black Saturday pre-empts regular programming.

Panelists and host 

In September 2021, it was reported that all four panelists from the previous season will return, to be joined by a fifth permanent panelist. Bayani Agbayani was revealed as the fifth permanent panelist on March 10, 2022.

The panelists started a competition among themselves to get the most correct guesses on the identity of the masked singers. They were grouped into two—Agbayani, Guidicelli, and Muhlach as Team Boys, and Molina and Reyes as Team Girls. This mechanic was formalized in the second episode as the Hula Maskedters. The first team to give the correct name of the masked singer within the entire season earns a point. The team with the most points at the end of the semifinals wins the Hula Maskedters trophy.

At the end of the semifinals, Team Boys won against Team Girls with a final score of 6–5.

Contestants  
This season features 16 masked celebrities. The masks were revealed during the virtual media conference of the show on March 14, 2022.

Episodes

Week 1 (March 19)

Week 2 (March 26)

Week 3 (April 2)

Week 4 (April 9)

Week 5 (April 23)

Week 6 (April 30)

Week 7 (May 7)

Week 8 (May 14)

Week 9 (May 21)

Week 10 (May 28)

Week 11 (June 4)
No clues were presented during this episode.

Week 12 (June 11)
No clues were presented during this episode.

Week 13 (June 18)
Group number: "Butter" by BTS

Specials (June 25)

References 

Masked Singer
2022 Philippine television seasons